The Center for Research in Security Prices (CRSP) is a provider of historical stock market data. The Center is a part of the Booth School of Business at the University of Chicago. CRSP maintains some of the largest and most comprehensive proprietary historical databases in stock market research. Academic researchers and investment professionals rely on CRSP for accurate, survivor bias-free information which provides a foundation for their research and analyses. As of 2020, CRSP claims over 500 clients. The name is usually pronounced "crisp".

CRSP was founded in 1960 by James H. Lorie (professor of finance and director of research) and Lawrence Fisher (assistant professor of finance) of the University of Chicago, with a grant from Merrill Lynch, Pierce, Fenner & Smith. Its goal was to provide a source of accurate and comprehensive data that could be used to answer basic questions about the behavior of stock markets. The first effort of the Center was the production of a database consisting of monthly stock prices on the New York Stock Exchange for all common stocks from 1926 to 1962. Dividends, shares outstanding, capital changes, and delisting information was also included. Taken together, this data made possible the first comprehensive study of the rates of return on common stocks. Since then the database has been kept up to date to the present day, daily data has been expanded back to 1926, and other exchanges and financial instruments have been added.

On January 1, 2020, CRSP spun off from Chicago Booth and became CRSP, LLC. CRSP, LLC is an affiliate of the University of Chicago Booth School of Business.

CRSP's flagship databases include:
 Common stocks on the NYSE from 1926, AMEX from 1962, and NASDAQ from 1972
 CRSP Indexes
 NASDAQ and S&P 500 Composite Indices
 NASDAQ and AMEX Industry Indices
 US Treasury bonds
 Survivor bias-free mutual funds
 Market capitalization reports;
 Proxy graphs for 10-K SEC filings
 Other custom datasets

In partnership with Compustat, CRSP provides the CRSP/Compustat Merged Database, and in partnership with the Ziman School of Real Estate at UCLA's Anderson School of Business, the CRSP/Ziman REIT Data Series.

Notes

References

External links 

Economic research institutes
Research institutes of the University of Chicago